Ejnar Mikkelsen Range is a mountain range in King Christian IX Land, eastern Greenland. Administratively it is part of the Sermersooq Municipality.

The range is part of the greater Watkins Range and is named after Danish polar explorer Ejnar Mikkelsen. The highest peak is one of the most impressive mountains in Greenland and has a good reputation among alpinists. It was first climbed in 1970 by Andrew Ross leading a Scottish team, and for the second time in 1998 by Roland Aeschimann leading a Swiss team.

Geography
It is located east of the main Watkins Range on the eastern side of the Kronborg Glacier and west of the Borgtinderne, another nunatak with high peaks. Its northern end connects with the northern part of the Watkins Range. The area of this range is uninhabited.

Mountains
None of the other peaks in the nunatak rises above . 
This summit is one of the highest summits in Greenland and it is marked as a  peak in some sources. 
 Ejnar Mikkelsen Fjeld (3,282 m); highest peak at 
 Tall peak further south (2,724 m) at 
 Tall peak further north (2,679 m) at

Climate
Polar climate prevails in the region. The average annual temperature in the area of the range is -14 °C. The warmest month is July when the average temperature reaches -2 °C and the coldest is February when the temperature sinks to -22 °C.

See also
List of mountain ranges of Greenland
List of mountains in Greenland
 List of Nunataks of Greenland
List of the major 3000-meter summits of North America
List of Ultras of North America
Syenite

References

External links
The Development of Mountaineering in East and North-East Greenland- An Outline History
The Kap Gustav Holm Tertiary Plutonic Centre, East Greenland
Tertiary Magmatism In East Greenland And Hotspot Magmatism Worldwide

Mountain ranges of Greenland
Nunataks of Greenland
Sermersooq